Tito Veizaga Cossío (born 15 June 1961) is a Bolivian cocalero activist, politician, and trade unionist who served as a member of the Chamber of Deputies from La Paz, representing circumscription 17 from 2015 to 2020. A member of the Movement for Socialism, Veizaga followed the usual path taken by rural union leaders, scaling the ranks of trade syndicate leadership until reaching the departmental level. In 2004, he was elected to serve as mayor of Cajuata, and though he failed in his attempt at reelection in 2010, he maintained a presence in his party's internal structure. In 2014, Veizaga was elected to represent the Yungas region in the Chamber of Deputies. Though many local cocaleros opposed the government's attempt at regulating their crop, Veizaga held the party line, supporting the passage of the 2017 General Law of Coca. He was not nominated for reelection.

Early life and political career 
An ethnic Quechua, Tito Veizaga was born on 15 June 1961 in Cochabamba. During his childhood, Veizaga and his family moved to Inquisivi, a province in La Paz's tropical coca-growing Yungas region. He spent a large part of his early life scaling local leadership positions in his community, in addition to those of the area's trade unions, holding posts at the municipal, provincial, and, ultimately, departmental levels.

Veizaga's entry into politics was facilitated through the Movement for Socialism (MAS-IPSP), a party historically affiliated with Cochabamba's Chapare coca growers but which, since 2001, had begun making inroads with Yungas-based growers' unions as well. The MAS's increased cooperation with these rural syndicates and trade associations provided it with a solid pool of political candidates for the 2004 municipal elections, with which it made notable incursions into local administration in regions such as the Yungas, where figures like Veizaga were elected as mayors and city councillors. Specifically, Veizaga was nominated to run in Cajuata, winning the mayoralty by a low but not insubstantial popular vote plurality. However, he failed in his attempt to seek reelection in 2010, being defeated by Freddy Laura of the Departmental Association of Coca Producers (ADEPCOCA). Veizaga's ousting at the hands of a rival coca growers' association represented a shift in disposition towards the MAS on the part of the Yungas-based cocaleros. If by 2005 the party had largely unified the Chapare and Yungas cocalero movements behind a single front, by the start of the 2010s, many Yungas cultivators had gown malcontent with the government's seeming favoritism towards Chapare growers.

Chamber of Deputies

Election 

Despite his defeat, Veizaga maintained the trust of MAS leadership and continued to operate within the party, serving as its departmental president for La Paz. In 2014, he was nominated for a seat in the Chamber of Deputies in representation of La Paz's circumscription 17, encompassing the three Yungas-based provinces. Although struggles over coca policy eroded electoral support for the MAS in the Yungas region, many local cocaleros had not yet suffered significant economic losses and, consequently, continued to support the government's continuation, delivering strong majorities for the MAS and its candidates in the 2014 election. As a result, Veizaga overwhelmingly won his race, nearly septupling the vote of his next closest competitor, though his margin is reduced to just fifty-six percent when considering the abundant number of blank and null ballots cast.

Tenure 
Veizaga's parliamentary term coincided with the government's attempt to definitively implement a new General Law of Coca to replace the one enacted in 1988. For cocaleros of the traditional coca-growing Yungas region, the new law threatened their privileged status by extending the zone of legal production in the Chapare and expanding the government's regulatory oversight over their crop. In a bid to block the legislation, ADEPCOCA sought the support of the Yungas' two parliamentary representatives: Veizaga and Senator Ancelma Perlacios. However, both legislators refused to file a motion of unconstitutionality on the coca growers' behalf, leading ADEPCOCA to censure them and enlist five opposition deputies to represent them instead. Ultimately, the passage of the General Law of Coca—ratified six months later by MAS parliamentarians, including Veizaga, and upheld by the Plurinational Constitutional Court—broke the government's fragile relationship with ADEPCOCA and other Yungas cocaleros. For his part, the situation surrounding the General Law of Coca marked the highlight of Veizaga's tenure. He was not nominated for reelection, with the MAS maintaining the practice of almost entirely renewing its party lists for each successive electoral cycle.

Commission assignments 
 Constitution, Legislation, and Electoral System Commission
 Constitutional Development and Legislation Committee (–)
 Rural Native Indigenous Peoples and Nations, Cultures, and Interculturality Commission
 Coca Leaf Committee (Secretary; –)
 Planning, Economic Policy, and Finance Commission
 Science and Technology Committee (–)

Electoral history

References

Notes

Footnotes

Bibliography

External links 
 Deputies profile Vice Presidency .
 Deputies profile Chamber of Deputies . Archived from the original on 29 June 2020.

1961 births
Living people
21st-century Bolivian politicians
Bolivian politicians of indigenous peoples descent
Bolivian trade unionists
Cocalero activists
Mayors of places in Bolivia
Members of the Bolivian Chamber of Deputies from La Paz
Movement for Socialism (Bolivia) politicians
People from Cochabamba
People from Inquisivi Province
Quechua politicians